Saadatabad (also Romanized as Sa‘ādatābād) is a village in Ekhtiarabad Rural District, in the Central District of Kerman County, Kerman Province, Iran. At the 2006 census, its population was 917, in 238 families.

References 

Populated places in Kerman County